Katie Kauffman Beach (born September 26, 1974, in Reading, Pennsylvania) is a field hockey player and coach. She played for the United States Women's National Team in 180 international games, including the 1996 Olympics in Atlanta.  She was inducted into the United States Field Hockey Hall of Fame in 2014.

Beach went to college at the University of Maryland, where she studied marketing and played for the Terrapins, starting the year they won the NCAA championship in 1993.  She was a two-time All-American, and two-time U.S. Field Hockey Athlete of the Year. In 2004, she retired from the national team to coach at Columbia University, where she served for four years as head coach.  In 2009, she moved to Chicago and became the director and co-owner of Windy City Field Hockey, with husband Keith Beach.

International Senior Tournaments
 1995 – Champions Trophy, Mar del Plata, Argentina (3rd)
 1996 – Summer Olympics, Atlanta, USA (5th)
 1997 – Champions Trophy, Berlin, Germany (6th)
 1998 – World Cup, Utrecht, The Netherlands (8th)
 1999 – Pan American Games, Winnipeg, Canada (2nd)
 2000 – Olympic Qualifying Tournament, Milton Keynes, England (6th)
 2001 – Pan America Cup, Kingston, Jamaica (2nd)
 2002 – Champions Challenge, Johannesburg, South Africa (5th)
 2002 – USA vs India WC Qualifying Series, Cannock, England (1st)
 2002 – World Cup, Perth, Australia  (9th)
 2003 – Pan American Games, Santo Domingo, Dominican Republic (2nd)
 2004 – Olympic Qualifying Tournament, Auckland, New Zealand (6th)
 2004 – Pan America Cup, Bridgetown, Barbados (2nd)

References

External links
 
 Profile on US Field Hockey(archived on March 12, 2007; via the Internet Archive)

1974 births
Living people
American female field hockey players
American field hockey coaches
Sportspeople from Reading, Pennsylvania
Olympic field hockey players of the United States
Field hockey players at the 1996 Summer Olympics
Maryland Terrapins field hockey players
Columbia Lions field hockey coaches